Falls Creek is a tributary of the Delaware River wholly contained in Bridgeton Township, Bucks County, Pennsylvania in the United States. The creek boasts the highest falls in Bucks County.

Statistics
Falls Creek was entered into the Geographic Names Information System on 1 February 1990 as identification number 1202458. The average slope is about 282 feet per mile, or 52 meters per kilometer.

Course
Falls Creek rises with Pennsylvania State Game Lands Number 56 to the west and Ringing Rocks County Park to the northeast. The creek flows for a very short distance to the east then turns north where it receives a tributary from the right, then continues north until it drains into the Pennsylvania Canal (Delaware Division). Just a short distance from the canal, it passes over High Falls, the highest falls in Bucks County.

Geology
Appalachian Highlands Division
Piedmont Province
Gettysburg-Newark Lowland Section
Brunswick Formation
Diabase
Atlantic Plain
Atlantic Coastal Plain Province
Lowland and Intermediate Upland Section
Trenton Gravel
Most of the path of Falls Creek lies in a bed of igneous rock of diabase formed as an intrusion into the surrounding Brunswick Formation. The diabase consists of dark gray to black rock, mineralogy consists of labradorite and augite. As it flows down the High Falls, it transitions into the Brunswick, laid down during the Jurassic and Triassic and consists of mudstone, siltstone, and shale. Mineralogy includes argillite and hornfels. Lastly, it enters the river lowland known as Trenton Gravel, a bed laid down during the Quaternary, consisting of sand and clay.

Crossings and Bridges

See also
List of rivers of the United States
List of rivers of Pennsylvania
List of Delaware River tributaries

References

Rivers of Bucks County, Pennsylvania
Rivers of Pennsylvania